Sonia Primrose Anderson   (1944 - 8 September 2020) was an archivist.

Career
Anderson gained a BLitt from the University of Oxford in 1970, where she studied at Somerville College. She initially worked for the Society of Antiquaries of London before moving to the Royal Commission on Historical Manuscripts where she remained for the rest of her working life. Sonia was the  assistant editor of the Journal of the Society of Archivists for over sixteen years and had served as its reviews editor for a decade upon her retirement in 1992. She was elected as a fellow of the Society of Antiquaries of London in March 1994, and was also a fellow of the Royal Historical Society.

Select publications
Anderson, S. 1989. An English Consul in Turkey: Paul Rycaut in Smyrna 1667-1678. Oxford, Clarendon Press.

References

1944 births
2020 deaths
Fellows of the Society of Antiquaries of London
Alumni of Somerville College, Oxford
British archivists
Fellows of the Royal Historical Society
People associated with The National Archives (United Kingdom)
Female archivists